Piberaline (EGYT-475; Trelibet) is a psychoactive drug and member of the piperazine chemical class which was developed in the 1980s. It has stimulant and antidepressant effects which are thought to be due largely to its active metabolite benzylpiperazine. It was researched to a limited extent in Hungary and Spain, but was not widely accepted and does not seem to be in current use, although a closely related drug befuraline with similar effects has been slightly more successful.

Synthesis

2-Chloropyridine, carbon monoxide & BZP reacted together.

Or from picolinic acid & BZP.

See also
 Substituted piperazine
 Befuraline
 Fipexide

References

Piperazines
Carboxamides
2-Pyridyl compounds
Serotonin-norepinephrine-dopamine releasing agents